Hambühren is a municipality in the district of Celle, in Lower Saxony, Germany.

History
From the summer of 1944 to February 1945, a satellite camp of Bergen-Belsen concentration camp was in operation at Hambühren. Guarded by SS staff, around 400 female prisoners were forced to expand the former potash mine and to lay train tracks to it, work carried out by the company Hochtief. The tunnels were intended as an underground production site for Bremen plane manufacturer Focke-Wulf.

References

Celle (district)